John Deery is an Australian former professional rugby league footballer who played for the St. George Dragons and the Sydney City Roosters.

Deery, a speedy backline player from country New South Wales, attended St Gregory's College, Campbelltown and has an athletics background. He was a national junior decathlon champion. Late in the 1994 NSWRL season, Deery played three first-grade games for St George, then from 1995 to 1996 appeared in four games with Sydney City.

References

External links
John Deery at Rugby League project

Year of birth missing (living people)
Living people
Australian rugby league players
St. George Dragons players
Sydney Roosters players
Rugby league players from New South Wales
Rugby league centres
Rugby league fullbacks
Rugby league wingers